Accasta is a stacking abstract strategy board game on a hexagonal board for two players. The game was designed by Dieter Stein and published solely over the web and in the German game design magazine .

History
Accasta was influenced by Dr. Emanuel Lasker's Lasca and Wladyslaw Gliński's hexagonal chess. Dieter Stein tried to achieve a clean and original game differing from the hexagonal chess but to have minor similarities.

After a long time of development, in the spring of 1998, the game became published on the Web and in a German game inventor's magazine. That same year it was published, Accosta took part in some game design competitions and was one of the finalists of the Premio Archimede in Italy in 1998. Just three years later, in 2001, the first version of the game available for online play was developed and implemented.

Gameplay
Accasta is played similarly as a combination of chess and backgammon. Like chess, Accasta has a fixed initial setup and various different pieces. Like backgammon, Accasta has pieces that move toward a target area, blocking enemy pieces, but it has no dice. The main idea of the game is the use of stacked pieces. Players can move multiple times and have the possibility to liberate previously captures pieces.

Trilogy
Stein creating a stacking game trilogy of three games which included:
Accasta (1998)
Abande (2005)
Attangle (2006)

References

External links
The game's homepages:
Accasta.com for information about the game
Accasta.net for online play
Accasta.org for technical discussion of the game
Accasta on Richard Rognlie's Play-By-eMail Server

Board games introduced in 1998
Abstract strategy games